Dark Matter is an indie metroidvania/survival horror video game developed by Interwave Studios and published by Iceberg Interactive for the Windows, Linux and macOS in 2013.

Development
Interwave Studios intended the game to be developed by a team of six and completed within a year.  It was clear that one year into production, the game was not in a complete state.  With funds running low, Interwave launched a Kickstarter crowdfunding campaign in June 2013, hoping to raise £50,000.  The campaign failed, leading to the development team being laid off that summer.

The game was released in a truncated form in October 2013, offering four levels, and with its ending missing.  The intention was that sales of the game could fund the rehiring of the development staff.  Both the management team at Interwave and the publishers at Iceberg were unaware that the ending was missing, and temporarily pulled the game from Steam in response.  A cinematic ending was patched into the game later that October.

Reception
Dark Matter received negative reviews from critics, such as a review score of 4/10 from GameSpot. Reviewers and players criticized the game's abrupt ending, leading to refunds being offered by GOG and the game being temporarily pulled from Steam.

References

External links

Dark Matter at MobyGames

2013 video games
Action-adventure games
Horror video games
Indie video games
Crowdfunding projects
Linux games
MacOS games
Science fiction video games
Side-scrolling platform games
Single-player video games
Video games developed in the Netherlands
Video games featuring female protagonists
Video games set in the future
Video games with 2.5D graphics
Windows games
Metroidvania games